The Centre City Building (formerly known as the United Brethren Building) is an historic building at 36-44 South Main Street at the corner of East Fourth Street in downtown Dayton, Ohio. It was designed by Charles Herby and built in 1904 by the F.A. Requarth Co. for the sum of $305,000 as the headquarters of the Church of the United Brethren in Christ Christian denomination.  Originally 14 stories, it was the tallest building in Dayton from 1904 until 1931.  A seven-story tower portion was completed in 1924, capped by a chapel for the Church, making it 21 stories total. It is considered to have been Dayton's first skyscraper.

It housed the general offices of the church, and of the succeeding Evangelical United Brethren Church.  It also served as headquarters to the United Brethren Publishing House.

It was sold in 1975, converted to a personal residence by its owner, then sat vacant by 2012.

It was purchased in 2017 by Centre City Partners LP, with plans for a $46 million renovation to include residence apartments, office spaces and retail shops.

This building was added to the National Register of Historic Places on December 10, 1993.

On Saturday, January 11, 2020, a number of the building's windows were blown out by powerful storm winds, resulting in the temporary closure of the neighboring Wright Stop Plaza, the downtown hub for the Greater Dayton Regional Transit Authority. At the time, the building was up for sale for more than four million dollars.

On November 10, 2020, a large pane of glass from the building fell onto a nearby sidewalk, forcing barriers to be erected. The building has been vacant since the mid-2000s, changing ownership a couple of times during that period. Dayton city manager Shelley Dickstein expressed that the building may see development following completion of the renovation of the Dayton Arcade.

Historic uses 
Church headquarters
Commerce/trade
Manufacturing

See also
 National Register of Historic Places listings in Dayton, Ohio

Sources
Eller, Paul Himmel,These Evangelical United Brethren (Dayton, Ohio:  The Otterbein Press, 1950).
listing at Emporis.com  (retrieved 22 September 2009)

References

External links

National Register of Historic Places in Montgomery County, Ohio
Properties of religious function on the National Register of Historic Places in Ohio
United Methodist Church
History of Methodism
Evangelical United Brethren Church
Skyscraper office buildings in Dayton, Ohio